Oscar Peterson and Roy Eldridge is a 1974 album by Oscar Peterson, on which he is accompanied by Roy Eldridge.

Track listing
 "Little Jazz" (Roy Eldridge, Buster Harding) – 4:45
 "She's Funny That Way" (Neil Moret, Richard Whiting) – 7:34
 "The Way You Look Tonight" (Dorothy Fields, Jerome Kern) – 6:22
 "Sunday" (Chester Conn, Benny Krueger, Nathan "Ned" Miller, Jule Styne) – 5:48
 "Bad Hat Blues" (Eldridge, Oscar Peterson) – 7:34
 "Between the Devil and the Deep Blue Sea" (Harold Arlen, Ted Koehler) – 5:16
 "Blues for Chu" (Eldridge, Peterson) – 5:46

Personnel

Performance
 Roy Eldridge – trumpet
 Oscar Peterson – piano and organ

References

1974 albums
Roy Eldridge albums
Oscar Peterson albums
Pablo Records albums
Albums produced by Norman Granz